The Waiareka-Deborah volcanic field is a group of sub-alkaline basalt to basaltic andesite composition volcanics, that erupted 36.4 to 27.6 million years ago. They are found near Oamaru, South Island New Zealand, and are small Surtseyan volcanoes that erupted originally on a submerged continental shelf.

The former term, the Waiareka-Deborah volcanic group should not be used as any alkali basalt volcanoes in this group and all of those in the former Waiareka volcanic field are now assigned to the Dunedin volcanic group and its monogenetic volcanic field.

Geography
They extend on the present Otago coast south from just north of Oamaru, but well south of the Waitaki River, to the Moeraki Peninsula. There are probably Southern Pacific Ocean subsurface components from sonar studies but no such have not yet been characterised by core sampling. Accordingly,  a further area of up to  could yet be assigned to these volcanics. The furtherest inland deposit is at Basalt Hill just beyond the Maerewhenua River. There are Dunedin volcanic group eruptives between this and the coast and indeed most of the field is coastal.

Geology
Deposits without an age may need reclassification due to complexity. At least two examples of more recent alkaline Dunedin volcanic group eruptives through Waiareka-Deborah volcanic field crystalline rock have been characterised to date.

History
The first geological description of volcanics associated with the group was made in 1850 by Dr. Gidon Algernon Mantell in the Quarterly Journal of the Geological Society. This is acknowledged in the first comprehensive geology review of Oamaru district that uses extensively the term "Deborah limestone" with respect to sedimentary strata in relationship to the volcanics.

See also
Dunedin volcanic group
Dunedin Volcano
Banks Peninsula Volcano

References

Extinct volcanoes
Landforms of Otago
Polygenetic shield volcanoes
Volcanoes of Otago
Volcanoes of Canterbury, New Zealand